Omoglymmius aristeus is a species of beetle in the subfamily Rhysodidae. It was described by R.T. & J.R. Bell in 1989.

References

aristeus
Beetles described in 1989